The Wicked is Music is the name of a Crazy Penis album produced in 2002. Cover photography was by Simon King.

Track listing
"There's A Better Place!"
"You Started Something"
"Soulmutation"
"Keep On"
"Give It Up"
"You Are We"
"Change"
"Beautiful People"
"Bad Dismount"
"Mind Wide Open"

2002 albums